National League 2 South (known before September 2009 as National Division Three South) was a level four league in the English rugby union system until the end of season 2021–22. It was one of two leagues at this level, with its counterpart, National League 2 North, covering the north of England. The format of the league was changed at the beginning of the 2009–10 season following reorganisation by the Rugby Football Union. The champions were promoted to National League 1. The runner-up play in a promotion play-off with the runner-up of National League 2 North; the team with the best record having home advantage. The bottom three teams were relegated, to either South West Premier or London & South East Premier. Esher are the current and final champions.

The 2019–20 season ended before all the matches were completed because of the coronavirus pandemic and the RFU used a best playing record formula to decide the final table. Due to the ongoing pandemic, the 2020–21 season was cancelled.

The Rugby Football Union (RFU) approved a new structure for the National Leagues from the 2022–23 season. Along with National League 1 and National League 2 North the size of the leagues at levels 3 and 4 are reduced to 14 teams (previously 16), there will be a two-week break over Christmas and protected weekend breaks through the season. The competition structure will be reviewed every three years. As part of the restructure a third league was created at level four and most of the National League 2 South teams were placed into either National League 2 East or National League 2 West.

Final season

Eleven of the teams listed below participated in the 2019–20 National League 2 South season.  The 2019–20 champions Taunton Titans and Tonbridge Juddians, who won the (virtual) promotion play-off against Caldy, were promoted into the 2021–22 National League 1, while Canterbury were relegated into the division from the 2019–20 National League 1. Sides relegated from the 2019–20 National League 2 South included Sutton & Epsom (to London & SE Premier), Bournemouth and Old Redcliffians (both to South West Premier).

The promoted teams were Barnstaple who come up as champions of South West Premier while Rochford Hundred (champions) and Guernsey Raiders (virtual play-off) came up from London & South East Premier. Hinckley were level transferred into the division from National League 2 North in order to address an imbalance of teams in National 2, with Taunton and Tonbridge Juddians being promoted and only Canterbury dropping down from National League 1.  

Fifteen of the sixteen teams from 2021–22 were placed into one of the other level four leagues for 2022–23. Barnes, Bury St. Edmunds, Canterbury, Guernsey Raiders, Henley Hawks, Old Albanian, Rochford Hundred, Westcliff and Worthing Raiders were transferred to the newly-created National League 2 East while Barnstaple, Clifton, Dings Crusaders, Hinckley, Leicester Lions and Redruth were transferred to another new level four league, National League 2 West. The 2021–22 champions, Esher, were promoted to National League 1. No teams were relegated to level five.

2020–21
Due to the coronavirus pandemic, the 2020–21 season was cancelled.

List of champions

Area League South

National 4 South

National Division 4

Division 4 South

National 2 South

National Division 3 South

National League 2 South

National Two promotion play-offs
Until the 2021–22 season there was a promotion play-off between the league runners-up of National League 2 North and National League 2 South for the third and final promotion place to National League 1. The team with the superior league record has home advantage.  As of the end of the 2019–20 season the southern teams have been more successful with fourteen wins to the northern teams four, while the home side has won thirteen teams to the away sides five.

Number of league titles

Barking (2)
Cambridge (2)
Esher (2)
Henley Hawks (2)
Askeans (1)
Bishop's Stortford (1)
Blackheath (1)
Bracknell (1)
Camberley (1)
Cinderford (1)
Clifton (1)
Ealing Trailfinders (1)
Exeter (1)
Hartpury College (1)
Havant (1)
London Scottish (1)
Lydney (1)
Metropolitan Police (1)
Mount's Bay (1)
Newbury (1)
Old Albanian (1)
Penzance & Newlyn (1)
Plymouth Albion (1)
Rams (1)
Redruth (1)
Rosslyn Park (1)
Southend (1)
Sudbury (1)
Taunton Titans (1)

League format since 1987

Records

Note that all records are from 1996–97 season onwards as this is widely held as the dawn of professionalism across the English club game. It also offers a better comparison between seasons as the division team numbers are roughly equal (for example when league rugby union first started in 1987–88 the southern league had only 11 teams playing 10 games each, compared to 14 teams in 1996–97 playing 26 games (home & away), going up to 16 teams in 2009–10 playing 30 games each). Attendance records are from 2000 onwards unless otherwise specified. All records are up to date up till the end of the 2018–19 season.

League records
Most titles: 2
Barking (2004–05, 2009–10)
Henley Hawks (2012–13, 2014–15)
Cambridge (2005–06, 2015–16)
Most times promoted from division: 3
Henley Hawks (1997–98, 2012–13, 2014–15)
Most times relegated from division: 3
Havant (1998–99, 2002–03, 2008–09)
Barnes (2009–10, 2011–12, 2016–17)
Most league points in a season: 143
Cinderford (2017–18)
Fewest league points in a season: 0
Metropolitan Police (1999–00) 
Camberley (2002–03)
Most points scored in a season: 1,490
Ealing Trailfinders (2010–11)
Fewest points scored in a season: 270
Camberley (2002–03)
Most points conceded in a season: 2,055
Newbury Blues (2010–11)
Fewest points conceded in a season: 240
Plymouth Albion (2000–01) 
Best points difference (For/Against): 1,066
Ealing Trailfinders (2010–11)
Worst points difference (For/Against):-1,676
Newbury Blues (2010–11)
Most games won in a season: 29
Cinderford (2017–18)
Most games lost in a season: 29
Newbury Blues (2010–11)
Launceston (2015–16)
Most games drawn in a season: 4
Rugby Lions (2008–09)
Barnes (2015–16) 
Most bonus points in a season: 30
Bishop's Stortford (2014–15)

Match records
Largest home win: 132 – 0
Old Albanian at home to Newbury Blues on 26 March 2011 (2010–11)
Largest away win: 85 – 3
Henley Hawks away to Barking on 27 October 2012 (2012–13)
Most points scored in a match: 132
Old Albanian at home to Newbury Blues on 26 March 2011 (2010–11)
Most tries scored in a match: 20
Jersey at home to Newbury Blues on 6 November 2011 (2010–11)
Ealing Trailfinders at home to Hinckley on 12 March 2011 (2010–11)
Old Albanian at home to Newbury Blues on 26 March 2011 (2010–11)
Most conversions scored in a match: 16
Old Albanian at home to Newbury Blues on 26 March 2011 (2010–11)
Ealing Trailfinders at home to Lydney on 30 April 2011 (2010–11)
Most penalties scored in a match: 7
Blackheath at home to Redruth on 14 December 2002 (2002–03)
Hertford at home to Rosslyn Park on 30 September 2006 (2006–07)
Clifton at home to Lydney on 21 October 2006 (2006–07)
Dings Crusaders at home to Southend on 6 November 2011 (2010–11)
Launceston at home to Hartpury College on 28 September 2013 (2013–14)
Launceston away to Dings Crusaders on 27 September 2014 (2014–15)
Most drop kicks scored in a match: 3
Westcombe Park at home to Ealing Trailfinders on 5 December 2009 (2009–10)

Player records
Most times top points scorer: 3
 Matthew McLean for Worthing Raiders (2011–12, 2017–18, 2018–19)
 Gary Kingdom for Taunton Titans (2014–15, 2015–16, 2019–20)
Most times top try scorer: 2
 Phil Chesters for Ealing Trailfinders (2009–10, 2010–11)
 Ian Clark for Hartpury College (2011–12, 2012–13)
Most points in a season: 374
 Nat Saumi for Penzance & Newlyn (2000–01)
Most tries in a season: 70
 Phil Chesters for Ealing Trailfinders (2010–11))
Most points in a match: 45
 Adam Westall for Lydney away to Haywards Heath on 12 March 2005 (2004–05)
Most tries in a match: 7
 James O'Brien for Old Patesians at home to Old Colfeians on 27 March 2004 (2003–04)
 Phil Chesters for Ealing Trailfinders at home to Newbury Blues on 2 October 2010 and at home to Lydney on 30 April 2011 (2010–11)
Most conversions in a match: 16
 Richard Gregg for Old Albanian at home to Newbury Blues on 26 March 2011 (2010–11)
Most penalties in a match: 7
 Jonathan Griffin for Blackheath at home to Redruth on 14 December 2002 (2002–03)
 Kieron Davies for Hertford at home to Rosslyn Park on 30 September 2006 (2006–07)
 John Barnes for Clifton at home to Lydney on 21 October 2006 (2006–07)
 Mitch Burton for Dings Crusaders at home to Southend on 6 November 2011 (2010–-11)
 Luke Cozens for Hartpury College away to Dings Crusaders on 17 November 2012 (2012–13)
 Danial Trigg for Dings Crusaders away to Lydney on 1 December 2012 (2012–13)
 Kieron Lewitt for Launceston away to Dings Crusaders on 27 September 2014 (2014–15)
Most drop kicks in a match: 3
 Lee Audis for Westcombe Park at home to Ealing Trailfinders on 5 December 2009 (2009–10)

Attendance records
 
Highest attendance (league game): 3,270
Henley Hawks at home to Worthing Raiders on 4 May 2013 (2012–13)
Lowest attendance (league game): 0
Tonbridge Juddians at home to Sutton & Epsom on 21 December 2019 (2019–20)
Highest attendance (promotion playoff): 4,000
Redruth at home to Macclesfield on 1 May 2005 (2004–05)
Lowest attendance (promotion playoff): 473
Old Albanian at home to Sedgley Park on 14 May 2016 (2015–16)
Highest average attendance (club): 1,281
Plymouth Albion (2000–01)
Lowest average attendance (club): 96
Old Patesians (2006–07)
Highest average attendance (season): 573 (2000–01)
Lowest average attendance (season): 292 (2009–10)

All time National League 2 South top 10 point scorers

(Bold denotes players still playing in National League 2 South)

All time National League 2 South top 10 try scorers

(Bold denotes players still playing in National League 2 South)

Notes

See also
 English rugby union system
 History of the English rugby union system
 National League 2 North

References

External links
 NCA Rugby

 
Defunct rugby union leagues in England
Recurring sporting events established in 1987
Sports leagues established in 1987
Sports leagues disestablished in 2022